Godzilla: Unleashed is a 3D fighting video game based on Toho's Godzilla franchise. It was developed by Pipeworks Software and published by Atari. The game was released in North America on November 20, 2007 for PlayStation 2; and on December 5 of the same year for the Wii. A Nintendo DS version, titled Godzilla Unleashed: Double Smash, was also released in North America on December 5, 2007.

Unleashed serves as a sequel to 2004's Godzilla: Save the Earth, itself a sequel to 2002's Godzilla: Destroy All Monsters Melee. The game features over 20 Kaiju and Mechas from the Shōwa (1954–1975), Heisei (1984–1995), and Millennium (1999–2004) era films; as well as two original Toho-approved creations: Krystalak and Obsidius.

Gameplay

Like its predecessors, Godzilla Unleashed plays as a 3D fighting game with the option to play with up to four monsters at a time, with or without teams. While the PS2 version involves only button presses, the Wii version uses a combination of button presses and physically moving the Wii Remote and Nunchuk. Basic punch and kick attacks are through the A and B buttons while more powerful and aggressive strikes require swinging of the remote up, down or sideways while pressing A and/or B. Movement is done by the analog stick on the Nunchuk, and flicking it upwards allows players to jump. Flicking both the remote and Nunchuk allows monsters to grab nearby opponents or environmental objects, and throw them. Weapon and beam attacks also return, but are much less powerful and do not lock on, although they can be sustained for much longer periods of time. Rage Mode from the previous games is absent, but monsters can achieve "Critical Mass" by destroying the energy crystals found in arenas, which causes them to temporarily increase in size, glow red (similar looking to Burning Godzilla from Godzilla vs. Destoroyah), and deal more damage.

Monsters can also use one of seven "Power Surges", which are temporary abilities that can be used only once per battle, per monster. Surges increase certain traits, like for example the Fire Surge increases damage dealt and Speed Surge increases speed. They can also decrease abilities like Shield Surge, which increases defense while slowing movement. Others can improve and damage others like Radiation Surge that improves health regeneration while impairing that of nearby monsters. Before the Surge is over, monsters can release a powerful shockwave attack. In the single player Story Mode, multiple Power Surges can be collected through defeating an enemy monster afflicted with the Surge. In multiplayer mode, the Surges are obtained by destroying Surge Crystals that pop up in the environment.

Along with destructible environments, Earth's Military or the Vortaak's Forces are present, depending on the arena/city. Both will attack certain monsters each time. Monsters are attacked on differing circumstances. For example Global Defense Force monsters will be attacked by humans if they go out their way to destroy human buildings and military units being on the same side. The same goes for Alien monsters and the Vortaak. Destruction of crystals and use of Power Surges and Critical Mass can also affect military attitude towards certain monsters. In Story Mode, the Atragon appears multiple times throughout but due to the personal attitude of its Admiral, it will attack regardless of actions or faction.

Story

Unleashed takes place twenty years after Godzilla: Save the Earth, beginning when a meteor shower causes climate shifts and earthquakes. Simultaneously, monsters of Earth begin attacking cities across the globe as a result of crystals growing on the ground. Factions form among the members of Earth as well as the monsters attacking them, totaling four monster factions. Choices within the story affect later events, including the relationships between Earth factions and the monster ones. The Vortaak, returning from the previous games, choose to invade and use the crystals to seize Earth, but their mothership was knocked into the San Francisco Bay. It is revealed in the finale that the source of the crystals was SpaceGodzilla trying to escape his interdimensional prison that he was trapped in at the end of Save the Earth.

The game has four different endings depending on what faction you are on. Earth Defenders and Global Defense monsters remove the crystals, defeat the mutants, run off the Vortaak, and are congratulated by the human forces. Players on the Alien Faction destroy the human forces and see Vorticia laugh in victory. Those on the Mutant Faction allow the crystals to spread rapidly, and will witness SpaceGodzilla roar in victory. Any monster who has acquired all of the Power Surges will become corrupted and evil, with the reporter saying the player's monster was their only hope.

Playable monsters
The total number of playable monsters differs between the Wii and PS2 versions. The former has 26 playable monsters while the latter has 20. In both versions, monsters are divided into 4 factions: Earth Defenders, Global Defense Force, Aliens, and Mutants. In Story Mode, monsters of particular factions have different goals and take on a different order of missions. Each faction also has different styles of play and what they consider friend or foe. Some choose to destroy the crystals to get rid of them while others intend to abuse their powers, and so will reflect this depending on how the player chooses to act throughout. As players gain points with some factions for obtaining Power Surges, obtaining all seven Power Surges will null any allegiances the player has and unlock a secret level called "Tyrant", in which the player's chosen monster is given unlimited Critical Mass, but is forced to brawl against several monsters who may or may not have been former allies.

In addition to the established Toho created monsters, two original creations were developed for the game. The lava-based Obsidius was selected from a roster of 4 original monsters created by Pipeworks while the aptly named Krystalak was included by default in the Wii version.

Earth Defenders
Natural monsters who are very instinctive and protective of their territory, Earth. They see the crystals and Vortaak as threats and will go out of their way to destroy them, even if it means destruction of human cities. The Earth Defenders will ally themselves with monsters that destroy crystals while attacking those who use them to attain Critical Mass.

 Anguirus (Showa), Baragon (Showa/Millennium hybrid), Fire Rodan, Godzilla 1954 (Wii only; cannot be used in training or story mode), Godzilla 1990s (Available in PS2 and can be used in story mode; cannot be used in training or story mode on the Wii version), Godzilla 2000, King Caesar (Showa/Millennium hybrid, Wii only), Mothra (Heisei/Millennium hybrid), Varan (Wii only)

Global Defense Force
Human engineered mechas built to protect humanity from other monsters, the Vortaak, and the crystals. The GDF will ally themselves with monsters who fight the Aliens' monsters and the mutants, and minimize destruction of human structures. Due to their autonomous minds, GDF mechas can fall victim to and become corrupted by the crystals' energy.

 Jet Jaguar, Kiryu, Mechagodzilla 2, Mecha-King Ghidorah, M.O.G.U.E.R.A (Heisei)

Aliens
The Alien faction is made up of monsters that have allied themselves with the Vortaak invaders and thus want to destroy the humans and conquer Earth. Alien monsters are driven by power surges and attack monsters that destroy Surge crystals, Vortaak forces, and alien buildings. They also ally themselves with those who preserve crystals and destroy human forces.

 Gigan, King Ghidorah, Mechagodzilla (Wii only), Megalon, Orga

Mutants
Monsters from the mutant faction are driven by a lust for power. They are drawn to the crystals and will destroy all in their path to get such power. Mutants will ally themselves with other monsters who fight everyone else and are willing to attain Critical Mass. They will also attack monsters who do not cause enough destruction.

 Battra (PS2 Only), Biollante (Wii only), Destoroyah, Krystalak (Wii only), Megaguirus, Obsidius, SpaceGodzilla, Titanosaurus (Wii only)

Unplayable
 Atragon

During production, several monsters were scrapped. The originally designed monsters who lost in the polls were known as Fire Lion, The Visitor, and Lightning Bug. Hedorah was considered, but was scrapped because cel-shading him proved to be time-consuming. King Kong was scrapped due to legal problems with Universal Studios. Zilla was considered, but scrapped due to his overall negative reception, though fans later criticized this decision. Monster X was considered, but scrapped due to his transformation sequence into Keizer Ghidorah being too complicated and the game engine could not handle more than one person playing as him at a time. Gamera was mentioned in an interview, and likely not included since he is owned by Kadokawa.

Development
Before the game was released, there was a six page 'designer diary' hosted on IGN that provided some information about working on the game. The first interview of the game with Pipeworks stated that the title was completely new and is specifically designed with the Wii Remote in mind. There were also plans to use WiiConnect24 support for downloading purposes, but this was not in the completed game. First screenshots of the PS2 version of the game were released during September 2007. A PSP version was also planned.

On October 9, 2007, IGN's development blog has revealed that Heavy Melody created the soundtrack for the game and that every monster has a unique theme song that ties to the overall feeling of their faction. On October 19, 2007, IGN stated that the PSP version of Godzilla: Unleashed was canceled; however, it was said that if the Wii version of the game sells well, they would consider bringing back the PSP version.

On November 9, 2007, GameSpot posted the sixth designer diary with lead developer Simon Strange talking about the factions' importance. On November 19, 2007, GameSpot put up a Monster Battles  feature to have people vote for which monsters they want to face off.

Reception

Unleashed received negative reviews on all platforms, according to video game review aggregator Metacritic. Play Magazine called the Wii version "among the best fighters for the system", while GameSpot stated, "Unleashed is the worst thing to happen to Godzilla since getting killed by Mothra's babies."

GameSpy praised the large lineup of playable kaiju as "ample fan service" while showing disappointment over the new original kaiju, Obsidius and Krystalak, being "a shame that these guys make the cut while classic foes like Hedorah and Battra are MIA (or confined to the PS2 version in Battra's case)."

The controls were criticized the most by critics, reportedly being unresponsive at times. Nintendo Power said of the Wii version, "Though Godzilla Unleashed is fairly accessible, even casual gamers may wonder why their creatures don't always do what they want," while IGN experienced "a good deal of lag between when you swing the Wiimote and when your monster attacks." Game Informer, however, more bluntly called them a "complete slop".

The visuals were also criticized with GameTrailers stating that the Wii version's films "are often seen as classics because of their low production values and hokey monster designs. Still, Godzilla Unleashed is simply unattractive with its low-res textures and washed-out color palette."

The game eventually sold around 800,000 units over its lifetime, outselling both Godzilla: Destroy All Monsters Melee and Godzilla: Save the Earth, the two previous games in the series.

Double Smash
The Nintendo DS version of Unleashed, Double Smash features gameplay akin to a side-scroller, similar to that of the Godzilla: Monster of Monsters. Although graphically 3D, its 2D gameplay made it similar to titles such as New Super Mario Bros. or Sonic Rush. Using the two-screen display of the Nintendo DS,  flying monsters appear on the top screen, while grounded monsters appear on the bottom screen. A multi-player option allows for a different player to control each monster.

Critical reaction to Double Smash was largely negative. IGN gave the game a score of 3 out of 10, saying: "None of the recent Godzilla games have been very good, but at least they were fun. Godzilla Unleashed: Double Smash cannot make this claim. It looks terrible, and reduces the King of the Monsters to a mush of no-texture polygons, then puts him in a tedious series of punching planes and kicking boats." GameSpot gave Double Smash a 2 out of 10, calling it "one of the worst DS games ever made," adding: "With a perfect storm of terrible game design, bad play mechanics, and uninspired destruction, this game does what oxidation bombs, volcanoes, and Matthew Broderick couldn't: It kills Godzilla." GameSpy gave the game a 1 out of 5, saying: "This brain-dead combat is perhaps the worst part of Double Smash. Slowly plodding through the stale levels, fighting the same enemies, and using the same techniques to win grows old almost immediately."

References

External links
 Toho Kingdom Godzilla Unleashed Wii site
 Toho Kingdom Godzilla Unleashed: Double Smash page
 
 

2007 video games
Atari games
Nintendo DS games
PlayStation 2 games
Video game sequels
Wii games
Video games set in San Francisco
Video games set in Seattle
Video games set in London
Video games set in Tokyo
Video games set in Osaka
Video games set in Australia
Video games set in New York City
Video games set on fictional islands
Video games set on fictional planets
Video games developed in the United States
Video games with alternate endings
Post-apocalyptic video games
Science fiction video games
Kaiju video games
Godzilla games
3D fighting games
Multiplayer and single-player video games
Pipeworks Studios games